Olga Leonidovna Sukharnova (born February 14, 1955, in Perekhodinskoye, Krasnodar Kray) is a retired female basketball player, who twice won the gold medal with the Soviet national team at the Summer Olympics; 1976 and 1980.

 Participation in the Final Four of the Champions League 1993 in Valencia
 Champion USSR in 1978
 runner up USSR in 1976, 1979, 1980, 1981, 1982
 finished USSR third in 1975 and 1977
 Champion France 1989, 1990 with Mirande
 Champion France 1991, 1992, 1993 with Challes
 Tournament of the Federation 1991, 1993

won gold medals at 2 World Championships 1975 and 1983
won gold medals at 9 EuroBaskets 1972, 1974, 1976, 1978, 1980, 1981, 1983, 1985, 1987
Europe Junior Championship Gold Medals in 1971 and 1973 
World University Games Gold medals at the 1973, 1977, and 1981 games

After her career in the USSR, she joined the championship in France, obtaining 5 consecutive titles, first with Mirande then Challes-les-Eaux.

she played for
 Spartak Moscow Region
 France BAC Mirande
 France Challes-les-Eaux Basket

Sukharnova was inducted into the Women's Basketball Hall of Fame in 2000.

References

External links 
 

1955 births
Living people
Russian women's basketball players
Soviet women's basketball players
Olympic basketball players of the Soviet Union
Olympic gold medalists for the Soviet Union
Basketball players at the 1976 Summer Olympics
Basketball players at the 1980 Summer Olympics
Olympic medalists in basketball
Medalists at the 1980 Summer Olympics
Medalists at the 1976 Summer Olympics